Liu Qing (born 1978 in Beijing) or Jean Liu, is a Chinese business executive. Liu is the President of Didi Chuxing ("DiDi", formerly known as Didi Duache and Didi Kuaidi), China's largest mobile transportation platform. She worked at Goldman Sachs Asia for 12 years, becoming a managing director in 2012, before switching to Didi Dache serving as its chief operating officer in July 2014.

After joining Didi Dache, she led the strategic merger between Didi Dache and its main competitor Kuaidi Dache which then created the car hailing company named Didi Kuaidi (later rebranded as Didi Chuxing) in 2015.

In 2017, Liu was included on the annual Time 100 list of the most influential people in the world. She forced Uber out of the Chinese market when she, and Cheng Wei, got Uber to sell its China operation.

Early life and education 
Liu was born in 1978 in Beijing. She is the daughter of Chinese businessman and Lenovo founder Liu Chuanzhi, and the granddaughter of Liu Gushu, a senior executive banker at the Bank of China. She received a bachelor's degree in Computer Science at Peking University, and a master's degree in Computer Science at Harvard University. She received an honorary Doctor of Commercial Science from New York University.

Personal life 

Liu currently lives in Beijing with her family. In October 2015, Liu announced internally that she was being treated for breast cancer at the age of 37. In early December 2015, she posted on her Weibo that she would return to work by the end of December after a two-month treatment. According to DiDi, she is now fine and "has been in all-in mode for quite some time". Liu is married and has three children. 

After being named one of the "50 Most Powerful Moms of 2016" by Working Mother, Liu spoke about how she balanced working for DiDi with her relationship with her three kids.

References

External links 
 Corporate Website of Didi Chuxing

Businesspeople from Beijing
1978 births
Living people
Peking University alumni
Harvard University alumni
Chinese women business executives
Chinese chief operating officers
Goldman Sachs people
DiDi people
High School Affiliated to Renmin University of China alumni
Asia Game Changer Award winners